Dickson or, as is common in England, Dixon, is a patronymic surname, traditionally Scottish and thought to have originated upon the birth of the son of Richard Keith, son of Hervey de Keith, Earl Marischal of Scotland, and Margaret, daughter of the 3rd Lord of Douglas.

History
"Nisbet in his Heraldry (Edinburgh 1722) says 'The Dicksons are descendants from Richard Keith, said to be a son of the family of Keith, Earls Marischals of Scotland' and in proof thereof carry the chief of Keith Marischal. This Richard was commonly called Dick and the 'son' was styled after him. The affix of son in the Lowlands answering the prefix Mac in the Highlands." As a result, Clan Dickson is considered a sept of Clan Keith. Richard Keith's son, Thomas, took the surname "Dickson" (in the earliest record spelled Dicson), meaning "Dick's son" or "Richard's son".

Although long recognised as a Sept of Clan Keith through Thomas Dickson's paternal line, in July 2012 the Clan Douglas Society of North America also recognised the Dickson/Dixon name as a Sept and Allied Family to Clan Douglas.   This recognition resulted from the direct connection through Thomas Dickson's mother, Margaret, daughter of William, the 3rd Lord Douglas and also Thomas' faithfulness to the Douglas Clan, notably to his second cousin  William, 7th Lord Douglas and William's son the good Sir James, 8th Lord Douglas.

Thomas Dickson (1247–1307) himself has quite a history. He was associated in some way with William Wallace, and was killed by the English in 1307 in battle. Tradition states he was slashed across the abdomen but continued fight holding the abdominal wound closed with one hand until he finally dropped dead. He is buried in the churchyard of St Brides, Douglas, and his marker shows him with a sword in one hand holding his belly with the other. Robert the Bruce made him Castellan of Castle Douglas the year before he was killed.

The Dicksons/Dixons (and 30 other derivates) family name was first found in Scotland whilst the Dixons in England who are of Scottish descent from Thomas Dickson living in 1268 are of the same origin as the Scottish Dicksons. Early records show Thomas Dicson, a follower of the Douglas clan, at the re-capture of Douglas Castle in 1307.

The Dickson's coat of arms show the Keith "pallets gules" and the Douglas "mullets argent", this is to show their descent from these two ancient Scottish noble families. The family mottoes include "Fortes fortuna juvat", "Coelum versus", for Dickson: translated as "Fortune favours the brave", Heavenward"; whilst "Quod dixi dixi" Dixon, is translated as "What I have said I have said".

References

Notable Dicksons

Performers and entertainers
Adrian Dickson (born 1977), British broadcaster
Barbara Dickson (born 1947), British actress and singer
Brenda Dickson (born 1949), American actress
Dorothy Dickson (1893–1995), American actress
Fiona Dickson (born 1940), British dancer
Gloria Dickson (1917–1945), American actress
Ian Dickson (born 1963), Australian music business figure and TV personality
Nicolle Dickson (born 1969), Australian actress
Pearl Dickson (1903–1977), American Memphis and country blues singer and songwriter
Peter Dickson (presenter), British radio personality
Tricia Dickson (living), American voice actor
Rob Dickson (living), Canadian songwriter

Politicians and activists
John Dickson-Poynder, 1st Baron Islington (1866–1936), British politician
Alexander George Dickson (1834–1889), British politician
Anne Dickson (born 1928), Northern Ireland politician
Charles Dickson, Lord Dickson (1850–1922), Scottish judge and politician
Fred Dickson (1937-2012), Canadian Senator, Government of Canada (politician and lawyer)
Frank S. Dickson (1876–1973), American politician
Gary Dickson (living), Canadian politician
Jeremiah Dickson, Governor of Nova Scotia
Joe Dickson (living), Canadian politician
Joseph Dickson (1745–1825), American politician
Julie Dickson, Canadian public servant
Margaret H. Dickson (living), American politician
Moses Dickson (1824–1901), African American abolitionist
Samuel Dickson (American politician) (1807–1858), American politician
Walter Hamilton Dickson (1806–1885), Canadian politician

Sportspeople
Bob Dickson (born 1944), American golfer
Bill Dickson (1923 – 2002), Northern Irish Footballer
Brandon Dickson (born 1984), American professional baseball player
Byron W. Dickson (1875–1930), American athlete and coach
Charlie Dickson (1934–2013), Scottish footballer
 Des Dickson (Australian footballer) (born 1941), Australian rules footballer
 Des Dickson (footballer, born 1948), Northern Irish footballer and manager
Herbert Dickson, Scottish footballer
Hugh Dickson (footballer, born 1899), Scottish footballer
Itimi Dickson (born 1983), Nigerian-Singaporean football player
Jason Dickson (born 1973), Canadian baseball player
Ken Dickson (1946–2013), Scottish and British wheelchair curler
Lee Dickson (born 1985), British rugby player
Lance Dickson (born 1969), American baseball player
Michael Dickson (American football) (born 1996), American football player
Murry Dickson (1916–1989), American baseball player
Paul Dickson (football player) (born 1937), American football player
Peter Dickson (footballer) who played for Scottish clubs Albion Rovers and Queen of the South
Rick Dickson (living), American athletics director
Rob Dickson (1963–2009), Australian rules footballer and film director
(Robert) Bruce Dickson (born 1931), Canadian hockey player, Gold medal Olympian
Ryan Dickson (born 1986), English footballer
Tom Dickson (living), American figure skater
Tommy Dickson (1929–2007), Northern Ireland footballer
Xzavier Dickson (born 1992), American football player

Writers
Alexander Dicsone (1558 - c1603), Scottish writer and agent
Carter Dickson, pen name of John Dickson Carr (1906–1977), American mystery writer
Clarissa Dickson Wright (born 1947), British food writer
Gordon R. Dickson (1923–2001), Canadian science fiction writer
Lieutenant Colonel H. R. P. Dickson (1881–1959), British political agent in the Middle East, and author of several books on Kuwait
Paul Dickson (living), American writer
Samuel Henry Dickson (1798–1872), American poet, physician, writer and educator
Dame Violet Dickson (1896–1991), British author and botanist

Others
Aaron Dickson (born 1980), Irish artist
Major General Sir Alexander Dickson (1777–1840), British Army officer
Alexander Dickson (1836–1887), Scottish botanist and botanical artist
Alexander Dickson (1857–1949), Scotland rosarian
Andrew Dickson White (1832–1918), American diplomat, author and educator, co-founder of Cornell University
Anthony Hampden Dickson (1935-2022), Jamaican Roman Catholic bishop
Bertram Dickson (1873–1913), British aviation pioneer
Brian Dickson (1916–1998), Canadian judge, and Chief Justice of Canada 1984–1990
Brice Dickson (living), Irish academic
Chris Dickson (disambiguation)
Colin Dickson (born 1956), British rosarian
General Sir Collingwood Dickson (1817–1904), British Army officer and Victoria Cross recipient
Sir David Dickson (1780–1850) senior British naval surgeon
Dawn Dickson (born 1979), American businesswoman
Douglas R. Dickson (living), Lecturer in Voice and Opera Retired, Yale
Earle Dickson (1892–1961), American inventor of adhesive bandages
Emily Winifred Dickson (1866–1944), first woman Fellow of a College of Surgeons in Great Britain or Ireland
Eva Dickson (1905–1938), Swedish explorer
Evangeline Dickson (1922–2004), British artist
Lieutenant Commander Harlan Dickson (1920–1944), American naval officer
Harry Dickson, fictional detective
Henry Newton Dickson (1866–1922), oceanographer and meteorologist
James Dickson (disambiguation)
Jane Dickson (born 1952), American painter
John Dickson (disambiguation)
Kwesi Dickson (1929 – 2005, Ghanaian priest, theologian, author and academic. 
Larry Dickson (born 1938), American racing driver
Leonard Eugene Dickson (1874–1954), American mathematician
Michael Dickson (Irish republican) (born 1964), IRA member
Michael Dickson (engineer) (born 1944), British structural engineer
Moses Oruaze Dickson (born 1985), Nigerian lawyer
Neil Dickson (living), British actor
Ngila Dickson (born 1958), New Zealand costume designer
Oscar Dickson, 1st Baron Dickson (1823–1897), Swedish Explorer and philanthropist
Renn Dickson Hampden (1793–1868), English bishop
Robert Dickson (disambiguation)
Sarah E. Dickson (1880–1965), first woman elder in the Presbyterian church
Thomas Dickson (disambiguation)
William Dickson (disambiguation)

See also
Dickson (given name)
Dickson (disambiguation)
Dickson baronets
Dixon
Dikson (disambiguation)
Dickinson

English-language surnames
Patronymic surnames
Surnames of Lowland Scottish origin
Surnames from given names